Tim Ambler (born 1937) is a British organizational theorist, author and academic on the field of Marketing effectiveness. Ambler featured on Marketing's list of the 100 most powerful figures in the industry. He is cited by the Chartered Institute of Marketing as one of the top 50 marketing experts in the world

Life and career 
Ambler was educated at Oxford University (MA in mathematics) and the MIT Sloan School of Management (SM in marketing). Before becoming an academic, Ambler spent some 30 years in business, initially as an accountant, switching to marketing, and his knowledge of the two fields enabled him to develop new approaches to marketing effectiveness and accountability.

As marketing director for International Distillers and Vintners (IDV) he was associated with the development of Bailey's Irish Cream, Le Piat d'Or, Smirnoff Vodka and Croft Sherry. More recently he held overall international marketing responsibility for IDV and worked extensively in the US, Canada, Africa and emerging markets.

He was senior fellow and then honorary senior research fellow in marketing at London Business School and has researched and written articles and books on Marketing effectiveness.

Since 2005, he has been a senior fellow of the Adam Smith Institute, contributing research papers and over 200 blogs.

Key ideas
His books include Marketing and the Bottom Line (Prentice Hall, 2nd Edition 2003), Doing Business in China (with Morgen Witzel and Chao Xi, Routledge, 3rd Edition 2009) and The Lucky Marketeer (Quiller Press, 2014).

The British Chambers of Commerce published Ambler's report on deregulation., as well as co-authoring 10 annual reports on the cost of regulation to business and the weaknesses of government processes for new regulations.

The Adam Smith Institute published a series of Ambler's reports on Deregulation.

The Centre for Social Justice published Analysis Paralysis: Assess safeguarding children by results (May 2015). 
    
The Worshipful Society of Marketers published Ambler's reports proposing a framework for Annual report narrative reporting, as a way of involving shareholders in marketing.

The Chartered Institute of Marketing published a report on Marketing Effectiveness to which Ambler was a principal adviser.

The Marketing Science Institute of America published the finding of Ambler's extensive research study of the use of marketing metrics in the UK and Spain.  They subsequently published a study of Dashboards and Marketing.

The Australian Marketing Institute published Ambler's guidelines for choosing marketing dashboard metrics.

Ambler was editor and a contributor to the Special Issue on Marketing Metrics of the Journal of Marketing Management.

On retirement, he took up music composition, primarily for voice and wind. London Festivals of Contemporary Church Music have featured 11 of his works and his Mass has been performed at Westminster Cathedral, Downside Abbey and St John the Baptist Cathedral, Norwich

See also 
 Marketing Effectiveness
 Marketing Accountability

References 

1937 births
Living people
British business theorists
Marketing theorists
Advertising theorists
Academics of London Business School
MIT Sloan School of Management alumni
Alumni of the University of Oxford
British expatriates in the United States